Monochamus is a genus of longhorn beetles found throughout the world. They are commonly known as sawyer beetles or sawyers, as their larvae bore into dead or dying trees, especially conifers such as pines. They are the type genus of the Monochamini, a tribe in the huge long-horned beetle subfamily Lamiinae, but typically included in the Lamiini today.

If sawyer beetles infect freshly cut pine logs, they can cause a 30–40% loss in value due to the tunnels their larvae bore. It is important to process logs within a few weeks of cutting or store them in water to minimize damage. Some species are known to transport phoretic Bursaphelenchus nematodes, including B. xylophilus which causes pine wilt disease.

Description 
Beetles in this genus are black or mottled gray in colour. Like other Lamiinae, the head is oriented vertically with ventral mouthparts. The scape (first antennal segment) has a circatrix, a carinate ring or scar-like area near the tip. Antennae of females are roughly as long as the body, while antennae of males are twice as long. The tarsal claws are divergent.

Taxonomy
The genus is very large, and its boundaries have varied considerably over time, with many species placed in this genus that have long since been removed, and species placed in other genera that have been added, and there are at least 20 subgenera presently recognized by most authorities.

Species

 Monochamus abruptus Holzschuh, 2015
 Monochamus accri (Dillon & Dillon, 1959)
 Monochamus adamitus Thomson, 1857
 Monochamus affinis Breuning, 1938
 Monochamus alboapicalis (Pic, 1934)
 Monochamus alboscutellaris Breuning, 1977
 Monochamus alternatus Hope, 1842 – Japanese pine sawyer beetle
 Monochamus aparus (Jordan, 1903)
 Monochamus asiaticus (Hayashi, 1962)
 Monochamus asper Breuning, 1935
 Monochamus atrocoeruleogriseus Gilmour, 1956
 Monochamus balteatus Aurivillius, 1903
 Monochamus basifossulatus Breuning, 1938
 Monochamus basigranulatus Breuning, 1952
 Monochamus basilewskyi Breuning, 1952
 Monochamus benito (Dillon & Dillon, 1959)
 Monochamus bialbomaculatus Breuning, 1948
 Monochamus bimaculatus Gahan, 1888
 Monochamus binigricollis Breuning, 1965
 Monochamus binigromaculatus Breuning, 1959
 Monochamus blairi (Breuning, 1936)
 Monochamus bootangensis Breuning, 1947
 Monochamus borchmanni Breuning, 1959
 Monochamus buquetii (Thomson, 1858) [= tuberosus]
 Monochamus burgeoni Breuning, 1935
 Monochamus camerunensis Aurivillius, 1903
 Monochamus carolinensis (Olivier, 1792) – Carolina sawyer
 Monochamus clamator (LeConte, 1852) – spotted pine sawyer
 Monochamus conradti Breuning, 1961
 Monochamus convexicollis Gressitt, 1942
 Monochamus dayremi Breuning, 1935
 Monochamus densepunctatus Breuning, 1980
 Monochamus dentator (Fabricius, 1793)
 Monochamus desperatus Thomson, 1857
 Monochamus diores (Dillon & Dillon, 1959)
 Monochamus dubius (Gahan, 1894)
 Monochamus fisheri Breuning, 1944
 Monochamus flavosignatus Breuning, 1947
 Monochamus flavovittatus Breuning, 1935
 Monochamus foraminosus Holzschuh, 2015
 Monochamus foveatus Breuning, 1961
 Monochamus foveolatus Hintz, 1911 [= unicolor]
 Monochamus franzae (Dillon & Dillon, 1959)
 Monochamus galloprovincialis (Olivier, 1795) – black pine sawyer or timberman beetle
 Monochamus gardneri Breuning, 1938
 Monochamus grandis Waterhouse, 1881
 Monochamus granulipennis Breuning, 1949
 Monochamus gravidus (Pascoe, 1858)
 Monochamus griseoplagiatus Thomson, 1858 [= ochraceomaculatus]
 Monochamus guerryi Pic, 1903
 Monochamus guttulatus Gressitt, 1951
 Monochamus impluviatus Motschulsky, 1859
 Monochamus inexpectatus Breuning, 1935
 Monochamus irrorator (Chevrolat, 1855) [= plumbeus, ruficornis]
 Monochamus itzingeri Breuning, 1935
 Monochamus jordani Nonfried, 1894
 Monochamus karlitzingeri Tavakilian & Jiroux, 2015
 Monochamus kashitu (Dillon & Dillon, 1959)
 Monochamus kaszabi Heyrovský, 1955
 Monochamus kinabaluensis Hüdepohl, 1996
 Monochamus kivuensis Breuning, 1938
 Monochamus laevis Jordan, 1903
 Monochamus lamottei Lepesme & Breuning, 1952
 Monochamus latefasciatus Breuning, 1944
 Monochamus lepesmei Breuning, 1956
 Monochamus lineolatus (Dillon & Dillon, 1959)
 Monochamus lunifer (Aurivillius, 1891)
 Monochamus luteodispersus Pic, 1927
 Monochamus maculosus Haldeman, 1847 [= mutator] – spotted pine sawyer
 Monochamus marmorator Kirby in Richardson, 1837 – balsam fir sawyer
 Monochamus maruokai Hayashi, 1962
 Monochamus masaoi Kusama & Takakuwa, 1984
 Monochamus mausoni Breuning, 1950
 Monochamus mbai Lepesme & Breuning, 1953
 Monochamus mediomaculatus Breuning, 1935
 Monochamus melaleucus Jordan, 1903
 Monochamus mexicanus (Breuning, 1950)
 Monochamus millegranus Bates, 1891
 Monochamus murinus (Gahan, 1888)
 Monochamus nigrobasimaculatus Breuning, 1981
 Monochamus nigromaculatus Gressitt, 1942
 Monochamus nigromaculicollis Breuning, 1974
 Monochamus nigroplagiatus Breuning, 1935
 Monochamus nigrovittatus Breuning, 1938
 Monochamus nitens Bates, 1884
 Monochamus notatus (Drury, 1773) – northeastern sawyer or notable sawyer
 Monochamus obtusus Casey, 1891	– obtuse sawyer
 Monochamus ochreomarmoratus Breuning, 1960
 Monochamus ochreopunctatus Breuning, 1980
 Monochamus ochreosparsus Breuning, 1959
 Monochamus ochreosticticus Breuning, 1938
 Monochamus olivaceus Breuning, 1935
 Monochamus omias Jordan, 1903 [= africanus]
 Monochamus pentagonus Báguena, 1952
 Monochamus pheretes (Dillon & Dillon, 1961)
 Monochamus philomenus (Dillon & Dillon, 1959)
 Monochamus pictor (Bates, 1884)
 Monochamus principis Breuning, 1956
 Monochamus pseudotuberosus Breuning, 1936
 Monochamus quadriplagiatus Breuning, 1935
 Monochamus rectus Holzschuh, 2015
 Monochamus regularis (Aurivillius, 1924)
 Monochamus reticulatus (Dillon & Dillon, 1959)
 Monochamus rhodesianus Gilmour, 1956
 Monochamus roveroi Teocchi, Sudre & Jiroux, 2015
 Monochamus rubiginosus Teocchi, Sudre & Jiroux, 2014
 Monochamus ruspator (Fabricius, 1781)
 Monochamus saltuarius Gebler, 1830 – Sakhalin pine beetle	
 Monochamus sargi (Bates, 1885)
 Monochamus sartor (Fabricius, 1787) [incl. subspecies urussovii] – black fir sawyer
 Monochamus scabiosus <small>(Quedenfeldt, 1882) [= centralis]</small>
 Monochamus scutellatus (Say, 1824) – white-spotted sawyer or spruce sawyer
 Monochamus semicirculus Báguena, 1952
 Monochamus semigranulatus (Pic, 1925)
 Monochamus serratus (Gahan, 1906)
 Monochamus shembaganurensis Breuning, 1979
 Monochamus similis Breuning, 1938
 Monochamus sparsutus Fairmaire, 1889
 Monochamus spectabilis (Perroud, 1855)
 Monochamus strandi Breuning, 1939
 Monochamus stuhlmanni Kolbe, 1894
 Monochamus subconvexicollis Breuning, 1967
 Monochamus subcribrosus Breuning, 1950
 Monochamus subfasciatus (Bates, 1873) [= fascioguttatus]
 Monochamus subgranulipennis Breuning, 1974
 Monochamus subtriangularis Breuning, 1971
 Monochamus sutor (Linnaeus, 1758) – pine sawyer
 Monochamus taiheizanensis Mitono, 1943
 Monochamus talianus Pic, 1912
 Monochamus thoas (Dillon & Dillon, 1961)
 Monochamus thomsoni (Chevrolat, 1855)
 Monochamus titillator (Fabricius, 1775) – southern pine sawyer
 Monochamus tonkinensis Breuning, 1935
 Monochamus transvaaliensis Gilmour, 1956
 Monochamus triangularis Breuning, 1935
 Monochamus tridentatus Chevrolat, 1833
 Monochamus tropicalis (Dillon & Dillon, 1961)
 Monochamus vagus (Gahan, 1888)
 Monochamus variegatus (Aurivillius, 1925)
 Monochamus verticalis (Fairmaire, 1901)
 Monochamus villiersi Breuning, 1960
 Monochamus x-fulvum'' Bates, 1884

Gallery

Three pictures of two separate sawyers found in a planting of Scots pines in Kansas.

References

External links

 "Insect vectors of the pinewood nematode: a review of the biology and ecology of Monochamus species"

 
Lamiini